The North Kildare Reapers were an American Football team formed in 2012 and participated in the IAFL from 2013 to 2017 seasons. The team merged with the South Kildare Soldiers after the 2017 season. The merged club plays as the Cill Dara Crusaders. The club Their first year of competition was 2013. They are a fully kitted team playing under the 2014 NCAA rules, as governed by the Irish American Football League.

The players have a wide range of experience levels.

The team trained and played their home games at North Kildare Rugby Club located in Kilcock, County Kildare.

Governance
IAFA
Irish American Football Association

Board Members

2016 Board

Colours and symbols

Past Chairpersons

Coaching staff

2017 Staff 
7 September 2016 News Release via Facebook.

2016 Staff

2015 Staff

Sponsorship 
 EA Sports Ireland
 Mcgargles Brewery
 Kerry Group

Field information 
The Reapers play at the North Kildare Sports Facility just outside Kilcock, Co. Kildare. Known by the players as "the graveyard" and by local residents as "the Maws".

History

2013 season 

Won the IAFL-1 League with a record of 6 wins and 2 losses. IAFA official season results.

2014 season 

Promoted to the Shamrock Bowl Conference for the 2014 season. Attained a record of 3-5.

2015 season

References 

American football teams in the Republic of Ireland
Sport in County Kildare
2012 establishments in Ireland
American football teams established in 2012
American football teams disestablished in 2017
2017 disestablishments in Ireland